Alan Humphreys (born 18 November 1939) is a former professional footballer who played as a goalkeeper for Shrewsbury Town, Leeds United, Mansfield Town and Chesterfield in the 1950s and 1960s.

Playing career
Humphreys was born on 18 November 1939 in Chester, England. He began his professional career at Shrewsbury Town in 1956, where he made 32 appearances in three seasons and built a reputation of being one of the best young goalkeepers in the lower divisions. In February 1960, he joined a declining Leeds United side that was relegated to the Second Division at the end of the 1959–60 season. He had an unhappy time at Leeds, losing confidence, and Don Revie brought in the experienced Tommy Younger and later Gary Sprake to fill the goalkeeping position. Humphreys left Leeds in August 1962 for non-league football before returning to league action with Mansfield Town in 1964–65 and later with Chesterfield.

References

1939 births
Living people
English footballers
Sportspeople from Chester
Footballers from Cheshire
Association football goalkeepers
Shrewsbury Town F.C. players
Leeds United F.C. players
Mansfield Town F.C. players
Chesterfield F.C. players
English Football League players